John Cavanaugh (born October 6, 1980) is an American attorney and politician serving as a member of the Nebraska Legislature from the 9th district. Elected in November 2020, he assumed office on January 6, 2021.

Early life and education 
Cavanaugh was born in Omaha, Nebraska. He is one of eight siblings. His father, John Joseph Cavanaugh III, was also a member of the Nebraska Legislature and represented Nebraska's 2nd congressional district in the United States House of Representatives from 1977 to 1981. His sister, Machaela Cavanaugh, is also a member of the Nebraska Legislature. Cavanaugh graduated from Creighton Preparatory School in 1999. He earned a Bachelor of Arts degree from the Catholic University of America in 2003, followed by a Master of Arts in environmental policy and a Juris Doctor from the Vermont Law School.

Career 
Cavanaugh was an intern in both chambers of the United States Congress. From 2006 to 2008, he worked in quality assurance for FirstComp Insurance. He also worked as an attorney and assistant public defender. He was elected to the Nebraska Legislature in November 2020 and assumed office on January 6, 2021.

References 

Living people
Democratic Party Nebraska state senators
Businesspeople from Omaha, Nebraska
Politicians from Omaha, Nebraska
1980 births
Catholic University of America alumni
Vermont Law and Graduate School alumni
Public defenders